This album of Dalida coincided with several changes in her career: the 1970s were coming, her label was no longer Barclay Records but her brother Orlando's International Shows, and she was also changing her style to a more mature adult contemporary music. The success of this album is the proof, exemplified by the Greek folkloric summer hit "Darla dirladada", "Ils ont changé ma chanson," and "Lady d'Arbanville".

Track listing
 Ils ont changé ma chanson
 Si c'était à refaire
 Mon frère le soleil (1er mix)
 Les jardins de Marmara
 Diable de temps
 Darla dirladada
 Une jeunesse
 Lady d'Arbanville
 Pour qui, pour quoi
 Entre les lignes entre les mots
 Ram dam dam

Singles
1970 Darla dirladada
1970 Ils ont changé ma chanson / Ram dam dam
1970 Pour qui, pour quoi / Lady d'Arbanville / Si c'était à refaire / Entre les lignes entre les mots

See also
 Dalida
 List of Dalida songs
 Dalida albums discography
 Dalida singles discography

References
 Dalida Official Website

External links
 Dalida Official Website "Discography" section

Dalida albums
1970 albums
French-language albums
Orlando (record label) albums
Sonopresse albums